Valašský hokejový klub Vsetín, also known as Hockey Club Vsetín, is an ice hockey team in the Czech 1. liga (second-level league). The team is the most successful team in Czech Republic ice hockey history, winning five straight Extraliga championships between 1995 and 1999, and another in 2001 for six titles in seven years. Their home arena is Zimní stadion Na Lapači in Vsetín. In the 2005–06 and 2006-07 seasons, they finished at the bottom of the league and did not participate in any competition in the 2007-08 season due to financial problems. Hockey returned to Vsetín a year later, when a new team was founded. The team has been playing in the Czech 1. liga since the 2017-18 season after being promoted from the Czech 2. liga (third-level league) in 2016-17.

Honours

Domestic
Czech Extraliga
  Winners (6): 1994–95, 1995–96, 1996–97, 1997–98, 1998–99, 2000–01
  Runners-up (1): 1999–2000

Czech 1. Liga
  Runners-up (1): 2021–22
  3rd place (1): 2020–21

Pre-season
Rona Cup
  Winners (1): 1997

Club names 
 1905 – SK (Sportovní klub) Vsetín
 1906 – Bruslařský klub Vsetín
 1933 – Sokol Vsetín
 1968 – Zbrojovka Vsetín
 1994 – HC (Hockey club) Dadák Vsetín
 1996 – HC Petra Vsetín
 1998 – HC Slovnaft Vsetín
 2001 – HC Vsetín
 2003 – Vsetínská hokejová
 2008 – Valašský hokejový klub (VHK)
 2016 – VHK ROBE Vsetín

References

External links 

  Official website

Ice hockey teams in the Czech Republic
Vsetín District